K-214 is a  north–south state highway located entirely within Jackson County in the U.S. state of Kansas. K-214's southern terminus is at U.S. Route 75 (US-75) southwest of the City of Hoyt, and the northern terminus is at US-75 northwest of the City of Hoyt. K-214 was first designated a state highway on December 13, 1961, to connect Hoyt to a new alignment of US-75, that was built to the west of the city.

Route description
At this point it turns north and travels approximately  then intersects West 4th Street, which is the former routing of US-75.

The Kansas Department of Transportation (KDOT) tracks the traffic levels on its highways, and in 2017, they determined that on average the traffic varied from 825 vehicles near the northern terminus to 1980 vehicles near the southern terminus. K-214 is not included in the National Highway System. The National Highway System is a system of highways important to the nation's defense, economy, and mobility. K-214 does connect to the National Highway System at each end. The section of the route within the Hoyt city limits is paved with full design bituminous pavement and the remaining portions are paved with partial design bituminous pavement.

History

Early roads
Before state highways were numbered in Kansas there were Auto trails, which were an informal network of marked routes that existed in the United States and Canada in the early part of the 20th century. The section of K-214 that runs north–south through Hoyt was part of the Capitol Route and Omaha–Topeka Trail.

Establishment
Originally US-75 traveled through the city of Hoyt. In a resolution passed on December 13, 1961, US-75 was approved to be realigned between Topeka and Hoyt.

On October 2, 1965, the American Association of State Highway Officials (AASHO) approved the relocation of US-75.

At that time, K-214 was created to link Hoyt to the new US-75 west of the city. The section from West 4th Street north to US-75 is part of the old US-75.

Major intersections

References

214
Transportation in Jackson County, Kansas